Thomas Ormer Fowler (4 December 1891 – 25 July 1963) was an Australian rules footballer who played with Fitzroy and St Kilda in the Victorian Football League (VFL).

Notes

External links 

1891 births
1963 deaths
Australian rules footballers from Victoria (Australia)
Fitzroy Football Club players
St Kilda Football Club players
People from Euroa